Stenoglene is a genus of moths in the family Eupterotidae from Africa. The genus was described by Felder in 1874.

Species
Stenoglene basquini Bouyer, 2012
Stenoglene bicolor (Distant, 1897)
Stenoglene bipartita (Rothschild, 1917)
Stenoglene bipunctatus (Aurivillius, 1909)
Stenoglene bouyeri Basquin, 2013
Stenoglene brunneofasciata Dall'Asta & Poncin, 1980
Stenoglene citrinoides Dall'Asta & Poncin, 1980
Stenoglene citrinus (Druce, 1886)
Stenoglene decellei Dall'Asta & Poncin, 1980
Stenoglene dehanicus (Strand, 1911)
Stenoglene fontainei Dall'Asta & Poncin, 1980
Stenoglene fouassini Dall'Asta & Poncin, 1980
Stenoglene gemmatus Wichgraf, 1921
Stenoglene giganteus (Rothschild, 1917)
Stenoglene hilaris Felder, 1874
Stenoglene latimaculata Dall'Asta & Poncin, 1980
Stenoglene livingstonensis (Strand, 1909)
Stenoglene nivalis (Rothschild, 1917)
Stenoglene obtusus (Walker, 1864)
Stenoglene opalina Druce, 1910
Stenoglene parvula Dall'Asta & Poncin, 1980
Stenoglene paulisi Dall'Asta & Poncin, 1980
Stenoglene pellucida Joicey & Talbot, 1924
Stenoglene pira Druce, 1896
Stenoglene plagiatus (Aurivillius, 1911)
Stenoglene preussi (Aurivillius, 1893)
Stenoglene pujoli Dall'Asta & Poncin, 1980
Stenoglene roseus (Druce, 1886)
Stenoglene shabae Dall'Asta & Poncin, 1980
Stenoglene sulphureoides Kühne, 2007
Stenoglene sulphureotinctus (Strand, 1912)
Stenoglene thelda (Druce, 1887)
Stenoglene uelei Dall'Asta & Poncin, 1980
Stenoglene uniformis Dall'Asta & Poncin, 1980

Former species
Stenoglene nahor Druce, 1896

References

 , 2012: Description de nouveaux Eupterotidae africains (Lepidoptera). Entomologia Africana 17 (2): 2-14.
 , 1980: Nouvelles espèces des genres Stenoglene Felder et Epijana Holland de l'Afrique Centrale (Eupterotidae, Lepidoptera). Revue de Zoologie et Botanique Africaines 94 (2): 457–488.
  2007a: Neue Eupterotidae - Arten aus Afrika (Bombycoidea, Eupterotidae). Esperiana, Buchreihe zur Entomologie, Memoir 3: 345–349. Abstract: 

Janinae